The Ricoh GR is a digital large sensor compact camera announced by Ricoh on April 17, 2013, one of a number of Ricoh GR digital cameras. It was succeeded by the Ricoh GR II in 2015 and the Ricoh GR III in 2019.

Ricoh GR
Unlike its predecessors (the "GR Digital" series), the Ricoh GR incorporated an APS-C image sensor, while retaining a relatively compact form factor. Coupled with its retractable lens, the GR is potentially the slimmest of any camera in its class when powered off. Aside from portability, reviewers praised the GR for its lens quality and ergonomics.

An unusual feature of the Ricoh GR was its built-in ND filter. Its maximum shutter speed was variable, depending on the aperture setting (ie, 1/4000s was only available at apertures smaller than 5.6).

The Ricoh GR series has been compared against the Nikon Coolpix A and the Fujifilm X70, other large sensor compacts with the same fixed focal length (28mm).

Ricoh GR II
DPReview said that over the Ricoh GR, the GR II is "a fairly minor update ... the camera isn't a dramatic update ... the core of the camera remains the same".

New features
802.11/Wi-Fi – to remotely control the camera as well as providing the option to transfer images from the camera to a mobile device or computer
NFC
Maximum shutter speed when shooting at f/2.8 increased by 1/3 EV to 1/2500 s
Can shoot 10 raw frames at its maximum shooting rate of 4 fps (up from 4 raw frames)
Can save either individual raw files or a composite raw file when shot in interval mode
Autofocus during movie shooting
Option to trigger movie shooting across Wi-Fi, using the browser-based GR Remote app
Seven additional effect modes for JPEGs
An extra 'Color Temperature Extension' white balance mode
The internal flash can be used to remotely operate Pentax AF360 and AF540 flashguns as slaves
Tap (half-press) the shutter to enter shooting mode if the camera has been turned on by holding the playback button, which previously required a full press

Ricoh GR III
The Ricoh GR III was announced as "under development" on September 25, 2018, immediately prior to Photokina that year. The camera was released in March 2019.

While the GR II was seen as an incremental upgrade, the GR III was the result of a longer development cycle and boasted more significant changes. Ricoh indicated that several key components, including the sensor and the lens, would be upgraded. The body dimensions would decrease slightly, with the built-in flash removed. As July 30th 2020 a new firmware version was released.

New features
Sensor resolution increased from 16 MP to 24 MP
Redesigned lens (6 elements, 4 groups) 
Three-axis sensor-shift image stabilization
Expanded ISO range of 100 to 102,400 (2 stops higher than the GR II's max of 25,600)
More compact design (note: on-board flash removed)
Simulate an anti-aliasing filter (first seen on the Pentax K-3)
Dust reduction system "using ultrasonic vibrations" (named "DR II")
Autofocus upgraded to a hybrid system, with phase detection used in combination with contrast detection
Capacitative touch screen
Minimum focusing distance improved to 6 cm from 10 cm
Video recording frame rate improved to 60 fps at 1080p (Full HD)
USB-C connectivity that can be used to charge the battery

Model differences

GR II Accessories
GW-3 21mm-equivalent wide-angle adapter / lens
GM-1 macro conversion lens

See also
Ricoh GR digital cameras
Ricoh GR film cameras

References

External links
Ricoh GR official website
Ricoh GR II official website
Ricoh GR official community site

GR